Halvard Angaard (27 October 1898 – 10 June 1967) was a Norwegian sport shooter. He was born in Kristiania and represented the club Oslo Østre Skytterlag. He competed at the 1924 Summer Olympics, where he placed 8th in the team contest.

References

External links

1898 births
1967 deaths
Sportspeople from Oslo
Norwegian male sport shooters
Olympic shooters of Norway
Shooters at the 1924 Summer Olympics